Parhelophilus flavifacies  (Bigot, 1883), the Black-legged Bog Fly, is a rare species of syrphid fly observed in the Eastern United States and Canada. Hoverflies can remain nearly motionless in flight. The adults are also known as flower flies for they are commonly found on flowers, from which they get both energy-giving nectar and protein-rich pollen. The larvae are the long tailed "rat-tailed" type.

References

Eristalinae
Articles created by Qbugbot
Insects described in 1883
Taxa named by Jacques-Marie-Frangile Bigot
Diptera of North America
Hoverflies of North America